I Cavalry Corps may refer to:
I Cavalry Corps (Grande Armée)
I Cavalry Corps (German Empire)
I Cavalry Corps (Nazi Germany)